Iain Fearn (born 16 December 1949) was a Scottish footballer who played for Queen's Park, Hamilton, Dumbarton and Airdrie.

References

1949 births
Scottish footballers
Dumbarton F.C. players
Queen's Park F.C. players
Hamilton Academical F.C. players
Airdrieonians F.C. (1878) players
Scottish Football League players
Living people
Scotland amateur international footballers
Association football inside forwards